The 2008 Elite League speedway season (also known as the Sky Sports Elite League for sponsorship reasons) was the 74th season of the top division of UK speedway and the 12th since its establishment as the Elite League. The first fixtures of the season took place on 29 March and the season ended on 27 October. The Coventry Bees were the defending champions from 2007.

Summary
New rules introduced for 2008 included three points for an away win compared to two points in 2007, and the removal of the bonus point, in which a team was awarded an extra point for an aggregate win over home and away matches against another team. Also new in 2008 was a relegation and promotion playoff between an Elite League team and a Premier League team. The two teams that finish bottom of the Elite League will face in each other in a two legged playoff with the loser facing the Premier League playoff winner over two legs.

The Poole Pirates finished top of the league table, with the Lakeside Hammers, Swindon Robins and Ipswich Witches occupying the other championship playoff places. Poole and Lakeside progressed to the grand final of the playoffs, with Poole winning the first leg at Lakeside 42–48, and the second leg at Poole 60–33, giving them a 108–75 victory. The Poole Pirates were crowned with their third Elite League title, and fifth championship overall. Wolverhampton faced Premier League team the Edinburgh Monarchs in the relegation/promotion playoff final, with Wolverhampton winning comfortably over the two legs with a 106–76 aggregate victory, and thus avoided relegation. Poole still had Magnus Zetterström, Bjarne Pedersen and Daniel Davidsson in their team, who were all members of the famous double double winners of 2004. They had since recruited Chris Holder, Davey Watt, Adam Skórnicki and Freddie Eriksson, who all made significant contributions for the Poole team. 

Jason Crump had left Poole for Belle Vue at the beginning of the season and missed out on a league title. Crump and fellow Australian Leigh Adams were victims of their own success, the pair had been the stand out riders for several seasons but they were so good that the league averages created problems for teams when assembling a side to adhere to the league's points limit allowance. Consequently teams had to decide whether to retain the rider or move them on, in the case of Adams, Swindon kept him but found it hard to bring in new signings to support him.

League table

Home: 3W = Home win by 7 points or more; 2W = Home win by between 1 and 6 points 
Away: 4W = Away win by 7 points or more; 3W = Away win by between 1 and 6 points; 1L = Away loss by 6 points or less
M = Meetings; D = Draws; L = Losses; F = Race points for; A = Race points against; +/- = Race points difference; Pts = Total Points

Results
Teams face each other four times: twice home and away. The first of the home and away meetings are called the 'A' fixtures, and the second are the 'B' fixtures.

A Fixtures

* Meeting abandoned after heat 12. Result stands.

Last updated: September 11, 2008. Source: BSPA

Colours: Blue = home win; Red = away win; White = draw

Home team listed in the left-hand column

B Fixtures

*Meeting abandoned after heat 13. Result stands.

Last updated: October 7, 2008. Source: BSPA

Colours: Blue = home win; Red = away win; White = draw

Home team listed in the left-hand column

Championship playoffs
Semi-finals

Poole and Lakeside progressed to the grand final

Grand final
First leg

Second leg

Poole win 108-75 on aggregate and are the 2008 Elite League Champions.

Relegation playoffs
Semi-finals

Peterborough win 114-71 on aggregate. Wolverhampton will face the Premier League playoff winners, the Edinburgh Monarchs, over two legs.

Final

Wolverhampton win 106–76 on aggregate and avoid relegation.

Elite League Knockout Cup
The 2008 Elite League Knockout Cup was the 70th edition of the Knockout Cup for tier one teams. Eastbourne Eagles were the winners of the competition.

First round

Quarter-finals

Semi-finals

Final
First leg

Second leg

The Eastbourne Eagles were declared Knockout Cup Champions, winning on aggregate 102-78.

Elite League Riders Championship
The Elite League Riders Championship involves the riders with the highest average from each club competing in the Elite League. It took place on 8 October 2008, at the Premier League track at Birmingham after the original staging of the event on 20 August was abandoned due to bad weather.

Format
The top 15 highest averaged riders in the Elite League plus one wild card and two reserves take part, although no more than two riders from each club participate. There are 20 qualifying heats, a 'last chance' qualifying heat and a final. The top two scorers from the 20 qualifying heats qualify directly for the final. The next top four scorers take place in the last chance qualifying heat, with the 1st and 2nd place riders from that heat also qualifying to the final.

Result
2008-10-08, Birmingham
Changes:
(5)  Jarosław Hampel (IPS) → Janniro (COV)
(6)  Lee Richardson (EAS) → Kennett
(8)  Chris Harris (COV) → Bjerre (PET)
(10)  Scott Nicholls (EAS) → Batchelor (SWI)
(11)  Adam Shields (LH) → Davidsson 
(12)  Bjarne Pedersen (PP) → Watt
(13)  Mads Korneliussen (SWI) → King (PET)
(14)  Andreas Jonsson (LH) → Schlein (IPS)
(15)  Hans N. Andersen (PET) → Bridger (EAS)

Leading final averages

Riders & final averages
Belle Vue

 10.94
 8.41
 7.36
 6.63
 5.90
 5.75
 5.70
 5.14
 3.32
 2.31
 1.96
 1.91

Coventry

 9.89 (15 matches)
 8.35 
 7.59 
 7.37
 6.97
 6.71
 5.42 
 4.52
 4.13
 3.02

Eastbourne

 9.58 
 8.65
 7.63
 6.72
 6.31
 4.93
 2.24

Ipswich

 8.67
 8.55
 7.93
 6.81
 6.38
 6.33
 6.18
 4.27

Lakeside

 9.98
 8.57
 7.73
 7.30
 7.25
 7.00
 6.72
 5.70
 5.38

Peterborough

 9.45 (22 matches)
 8.08
 7.67
 6.96
 6.49
 6.05
 5.78
 5.46
 5.32
 4.48
 2.46
 2.11

Poole

 9.30
 8.95 
 8.30 
 7.89
 7.29
 7.11
 6.05
 5.36
 5.18
 4.10

Swindon

 11.04 
 8.16
 7.38
 7.12
 5.53
 5.52
 5.06
 3.11
 2.80

Wolverhampton

  8.52
  8.46
  6.01
  5.85
  5.67
  5.14
  4.91
  4.90
  4.32
  2.72

See also
 Speedway in the United Kingdom
 List of United Kingdom Speedway League Champions
 Knockout Cup (speedway)

References 

SGB Premiership
Elite League
Speedway